is the third studio album by Japanese rock band Maximum the Hormone. It was the band's first album to chart on the Oricon charts, debuting at number five and selling 70,000 copies in its first week, after which it remained on the charts for seventy-eight weeks. The RIAJ certified the album Gold, selling more than 100,000 copies in Japan and 250,000 worldwide. In September 2007, Rolling Stone Japan rated Bu-ikikaesu #98 on their list of the "100 Greatest Japanese Rock Albums of All Time".

Three tracks went on for use in two anime series. "What's Up, People?!" and "Zetsubō Billy" were used as the opening and ending, respectively, for episodes 20–37 of Death Note. The song "Akagi" was used for the anime of the same name.

Track listing

Track information
 The track title "Chū Chū Lovely Muni Muni Mura Mura Purin Purin Boron Nururu Rero Rero" is based on an assortment of sound effects in Japanese, chū chū (meaning the sound of a kiss) lovely muni muni (the sound of someone squeezing something soft) mura mura (the sound of being horny) purin purin (the sound with which large breasts are emphasised in Anime) boron (the sound of something that pops out) nururu (the sound of moving around in something wet and dirty) rero rero (the sound made by the tongue going over something).

Personnel 
 Daisuke – unclean lead and backing vocals
 Maximum the Ryo – guitar, backing and clean lead vocals
 Ue-chan – bass guitar, backing vocals
 Nao – drums, backing and lead vocals
 Yasu-kun – recording engineer
 Takii – mastering

Charts and certifications

Album

Certification

References 

Maximum the Hormone albums
2007 albums